Oxymerus flavescens is a species of beetle in the family Cerambycidae.

References

Trachyderini
Beetles described in 1822